At least two ships of the Argentine Navy have been named ARA San Martín or ARA General San Martín:

 , was a  launched in 1896 and scrapped in 1947.
 , an icebreaker launched in 1954 and decommissioned in 1982.

Argentine Navy ship names